Lake Silver is a natural freshwater lake located in central Winter Haven, Florida. This lake has a  surface area and is completely surrounded by offices, clinics and residential areas. The lake, almost circular in shape, is surrounded on three sides by North and South Lake Silver Drive. Lake Silver Drive on the east side is also part of 1st Street North (SR 549). Lake Silver is surrounded by public land on all but its south and northwest shores. On the entire west and southwest sides is parkland. Directly across 1st Street, to the southeast, is the Winter Haven Hospital campus. Beyond the housing to the south and across South Lake Silver Drive is the main campus of  Gessler Clinic.

Lake Silver has one public boat ramp directly next to the Lake Silver Amphitheater. It has no public swimming areas, but since it is surrounded by so much land, fishing may be done there. The parkland on the west and southwest shores of the lake has its own attractions that enhance the recreational value of the lake. The park has shelterhouses for picnics. On the west side a combination paved golf cart, bicycle and walking trail skirts the lake. This trail travels a considerable distance north and south of Lake Silver.

Lake Silver is one of the deepest non man made lakes in all of Central Florida.

References

Lakes of Polk County, Florida
Winter Haven, Florida